Jean-Pierre Dupont (born 19 June 1933) is a member of the National Assembly of France.

Dupont was born in Algiers, Algeria.  He represents the Corrèze department,  and is a member of the Union for a Popular Movement.  He was President of the Corrèze General Council from 1992 to 2008.

References

1933 births
Living people
People from Algiers
Pieds-Noirs
Rally for the Republic politicians
Union for a Popular Movement politicians
Deputies of the 12th National Assembly of the French Fifth Republic
Deputies of the 13th National Assembly of the French Fifth Republic